Abdel Aal Ahmed Rashed (born 27 December 1927) was a featherweight (57–61 kg) wrestler who was a member of the Egyptian team at the 1952 Summer Olympics in Helsinki. He won a bronze medal, which was the only podium finish for Egypt that year. He was born in Alexandria.

References

External links

See also
 List of Egyptians

Olympic wrestlers of Egypt
Wrestlers at the 1952 Summer Olympics
Egyptian male sport wrestlers
Olympic bronze medalists for Egypt
1927 births
Possibly living people
20th-century Egyptian people